Grevillea aspera, commonly known as the rough grevillea, is a species of flowering plant in the family Proteaceae and is endemic to Australia, occurring mainly in South Australia. It is low, spreading to erect shrub with oblong to egg-shaped leaves with the narrower end towards the base, and pinkish to red and cream-coloured, green, yellow or white flowers.

Description

Taxonomy
Grevillea aspera was first formally described in 1810 by Robert Brown in Transactions of the Linnean Society of London. The specific epithet (aspera) means "rough to the touch".

Distribution and habitat
Rough grevillea grows in heath, scrub and woodland in the Gawler Range, parts of the Flinders Range and the Eyre Peninsula in South Australia. In Western Australia it is only known from the Rawlinson Range in the far east of the state.

Conservation status
In Western Australia, G. aspera is listed as "Priority One" by the Government of Western Australia Department of Biodiversity, Conservation and Attractions, meaning that it is known from only one or a few locations which are potentially at risk.

References

aspera
Proteales of Australia
Flora of Western Australia
Flora of South Australia
Taxa named by Robert Brown (botanist, born 1773)
Plants described in 1810